Jiří Koubský (born 5 August 1982) is a Czech football coach and a former defender. He is an assistant manager with the Swiss club Köniz.

External links
 
 
 

1982 births
People from Kyjov
Living people
Czech footballers
Czech Republic youth international footballers
Czech Republic under-21 international footballers
Association football defenders
FC Fastav Zlín players
AC Sparta Prague players
FC St. Gallen players
SK Slavia Prague players
FC Spartak Trnava players
FC Aarau players
FC Wil players
FC Köniz players
Czech First League players
Swiss Super League players
Swiss Challenge League players
Slovak Super Liga players
Swiss Promotion League players
Swiss 1. Liga (football) players
2. Liga Interregional players
Czech expatriate footballers
Expatriate footballers in Switzerland
Czech expatriate sportspeople in Switzerland
Expatriate footballers in Slovakia
Czech expatriate sportspeople in Slovakia
Czech football managers
Czech expatriate football managers
Expatriate football managers in Switzerland
Sportspeople from the South Moravian Region